Shane Thompson is a Canadian politician, who is a Member of the Legislative Assembly of the Northwest Territories for the district of Nahendeh. He is currently the Minister of Environment and Natural Resources, Minister of Lands, Minister Responsible for Youth, and Minister Responsible for Seniors. He was first elected in the 2015 election, and was re-elected in 2019.

Political career
Mr. Thompson was first elected to the 18th Assembly in November 2015, and served as Chair of the Standing Committee on Social Development. Mr. Thompson was also a member of the Standing Committee on Priorities and Planning, the Standing Committee on Rules and Procedures, and the Striking Committee.

Mr. Thompson previously served two terms (three years each) as an elected official with the Fort Simpson District Education Authority, spending the last four years as the chairperson. Over the past 35 years, he has served on various community and territorial boards.

Mr. Thompson was employed as the Senior Sport and Recreation Coordinator with Municipal and Community Affairs (GNWT) in the Deh Cho region before being elected as a Member.

Mr. Thompson completed the Community Recreation Leaders Program at Arctic College in 1989 and is currently working on a Masters Certificate on Evaluation at the University of Victoria and Carleton University. He also completed three years towards an Education degree at the University of Alberta.

Mr. Thompson is an active volunteer with Northern Youth Aboard, CBET and Fundamental Movement, and HIGH FIVE®. As well, he is a past member of the Sport North Federation Board, NWT Softball and of NWTRPA, and the past president of Seven Spruce Golf Course.

Mr. Thompson is the father of seven children - five daughters and two sons – and has eight grandchildren.

He has been a Justice of the Peace since 1991.

References 

Living people
Members of the Legislative Assembly of the Northwest Territories
21st-century Canadian politicians
1963 births